Bhabha is a surname. Notable people with the surname include:

Shaila Bhabha (born 2001), Dietitian 
Homi J. Bhabha (1909–1966), Indian nuclear physicist
Homi K. Bhabha (born 1949), professor at Harvard University and theorist of postcolonialism
Huma Bhabha (born 1962), Pakistani sculptor working in New York
Jacqueline Bhabha (born 1951), lecturer at the Harvard Law School